The presidential election held on 7 October 2013, was the fourth presidential election of the Federal Democratic Republic of Ethiopia to elect the country's third president. Mulatu Teshome was elected by the parliament to a six-year term. Incumbent president Girma Wolde-Giorgis is barred from seeking re-election due to term limits.

Background and electoral process
As a parliamentary republic, most administrative power and the effective ability is vested in the prime minister and his government, rather than the president, leaving the president as primarily a figurehead executive. However, the president retains significant Reserve powers granted by the constitution.

A presidential candidate is required to be elected by a joint session of the upper house and lower house of the Ethiopian parliament, the Federal Parliamentary Assembly, the House of Federation and the House of People's Representatives, respectively.

Potential candidates
Several persons have been the subject of speculation by various media sources as potential candidates in the election. The past two presidents, Negasso Gidada, and Girma Wolde-Giorgis, have hailed from the Oromo ethnic group, the country's largest, and thus it has been speculated that the ruling party, the Ethiopian People's Revolutionary Democratic Front, will again nominate an Oromo candidate.

Publicly expressed interest

Haile Gebrselassie, Olympic long-distance runner and businessman

Other potential candidates

Abadula Gemeda, speaker of the House of People's Representatives and former Minister of Defense
Ashebir Woldegiorgis, independent member of parliament and former president of the Ethiopian Football Federation
Aster Mamo, chief parliamentary whip of the government in the House of People's Representatives
Berhane Deressa, former Mayor of Addis Ababa
Bulcha Demeksa, businessman, founder of the Awash International Bank, and former chairman of the Oromo Federalist Democratic Movement
Eleni Gabre-Madhin, businesswoman and founder of the Ethiopia Commodity Exchange
Eyesuswork Zafu, President of the Ethiopian Chamber of Commerce
Genet Zewdie, Ethiopian ambassador to India
Girma Wake, former chief executive officer of Ethiopian Airlines.
Hailu Shawul, former chairman of the Coalition for Unity and Democracy
Kuma Demeksa, former Mayor of Addis Ababa
Merga Bekana, chairman of the National Elections Board
Mulu Solomon, former President of the Ethiopian Chamber of Commerce
Solome Tadesse, General Manager of the Ethiopian Radio and Television Authority

References

2013
Presidential election
2013 elections in Africa